Humla District,  a part of Karnali Province, is one of the seventy-seven districts of Nepal. Namkha is the largest rural municipal which lies in humla  Humla is the 2nd largest district (by area) of Nepal. The southern and middle parts of Humla District are inhabited by Khas communities, originating from Sinja valley, whereas the higher and northern parts of Humla are mostly inhabited by culturally Tibetan communities.

Nature
Wild yaks were once thought to be regionally extinct in Nepal, but was rediscovered in Humla in 2014.

Demographics
At the time of the 2011 Nepal census, Humla District had a population of 50,858. Of these, 87.3% spoke Nepali, 12.1% Tamang, 0.1% Magar, 0.1% Maithili, 0.1% Sign language and 0.3% other languages as their first language.

In terms of ethnicity/caste, 38.9% were Chhetri, 19.8% Thakuri, 13.0% Tamang, 9.8% Kami, 6.4% Hill Brahmin, 4.9% Byasi/Sauka, 3.5% Damai/Dholi, 2.3% Sarki, 0.4% Magar, 0.2% Badi, 0.2% Teli and 0.3% others.

In terms of religion, 81.6% were Hindu, 18.1% Buddhist and 0.2% Christian.

In terms of literacy, 46.8% could read and write, 2.8% could only read and 50.4% could neither read nor write.

Administration
The district consists of 7 Municipalities, all of which are rural municipalities. These are as follows:
 Simkot Rural Municipality
 Namkha Rural Municipality
 Kharpunath Rural Municipality
 Sarkegad Rural Municipality
 Chankheli Rural Municipality
 Adanchuli Rural Municipality
 Tajakot Rural Municipality

Former Village Development Committees 
Prior to the restructuring of the district, Humla District consisted of the following municipalities and Village development committees:

 Baraigaun
 Bargaun
 Chhipra
 Dami
 Dandaphaya
 Gothi
 Hepka
 Jaur
 Kalika
 Kalkhe
 Kermi
 Khagalgaun
 Kharpunath
 Lali
 Lauthi
 Limi
 Madana
 Maila
 Melchham
 Mimi
 Muchu
 Raya
 Ripa
 Rodikot
 Sarkideu
Saya
Srinagar
Srimastha
Syada
Thechaya
Yanchu
Simikot

Health care

Central/regional/zonal hospitals: 0
District hospitals: 1
Primary healthcare centres: 0
Health posts: 10
Sub-health posts: 16
Number of doctors: 6
Number of nurses: 35

Although there is a district hospital as well as primary health care centers, these are not enough for providing health services. The small health centers in many VDCs are often without Auxiliary Health Workers (AHWs), Auxiliary Nurse Midwives (ANMs) and Community Health Workers (CHWs). 
Many people still believe in Dhami and Jhakri and often resort to local practices before seeking allopathic treatment.

The Nepal Trust, which has been working in Humla since 1996, was one of the first NGOs in the district to address development (especially healthcare) issues at the grass-roots level. PHASE Nepal is a non profit organization which coordinates with the District Health Office in Simikot to provide comprehensive primary health services to the communities of Maila and Melchham, two of the most isolated VDCs of the district; as well as the neighboring villages who also received these services. The Trust was the only organization allowed to continue its development work throughout the district during the Maoist insurgency. The Torpa clinic was built by the trust almost 15 years ago to address the immediate need for health services. To date, the Trust has expanded services throughout the district including improvements made to the district hospital. Currently, Trust initiatives are related to ante/post natal care and infant mortality reduction programs. With its head office in Kathmandu, the Nepal Trust has its own satellite office and guest house in its Simikot office, which acts as a social enterprise (the first built in West Nepal) and along with healthcare works in education, renewable energy, heritage preservation, WASH, food security and agriculture, sustainable tourism development and income generation. Nepal Trust has been managing the Great Himalaya Trail Development Program since 2008.

Tourism 

Humla lies in the far west of Nepal, on the border between Nepal and China, and is used as the starting point for trekking and mountaineering, accessible from Simikot Airport. The trekking route to Tibet also starts from Simikot.

Trekking

The Nepal section of The Great Himalaya Trail ends in Humla at Hilsa at the border with Tibet. 
The Humla district is a historic part of the Tibetan Buddhist religious tradition, with several points of interest for the history, culture and values of a typical Buddhist life. It has eleven small villages of Tibetan origin. The Nyin Community and the Limi Valley are inhabited by Buddhist communities.

Mt Kailash pilgrimage 
In recent years, Humla has grown in significance as a preferred route for the pilgrimage to Mount Kailash in Tibet. The route through Humla has historically involved taking an ancient foot trail from Simikot to Hilsa, that goes along the mountain slopes on the left side of the Humla Karnali river. Both historically and in the present times, this route has been used by locals for trading at the nearby old trade mart of Taklakot in Tibet, and for undertaking the pilgrimage to the nearby holy sites of Lake Manasarovar and Mount Kailash in Tibet. This route involves a 4-5 day walk from Simikot to Hilsa, with overnight stops at a few villages on the way. One needs to cross the 4,530m high Nara La pass on this route. However, with the surge in the popularity of this route for the Kailash pilgrimage, travel companies offer helicopter flights to cover the distance from Simikot from Hilsa, which takes about 20 minutes. Furthermore, a motorable road is in the process of being built from Hilsa to Simikot. Nonetheless, if one wishes to fully experience the physically and spiritually elevating effects of a mountain pilgrimage, then the slower, physically more engaged way of walking this route is the better way of doing this pilgrimage. For an even greater immersive experience into the mountain cultures and ecology of this remote part of the Nepal Himalayas, one can take a detour at the confluence of the Humla Karnali and Salli Khola rivers, and thereby go to Hilsa via the Nyalu La pass and the Limi valley. On this second route, one can take another detour to visit the Lapcha La pass, very close to the border with China, from where, on a clear day, one can get majestic open views of Lake Manasarovar and Mount Kailash.

See also
Karnali Province
Zones of Nepal

References

External links
 
 Paudhur
Countries of Asia

 
Districts of Nepal established in 1962
Districts of Karnali Province